Deux-Grosnes is a commune in the Rhône department in eastern France. It was established on 1 January 2019 by merger of the former communes of Monsols (the seat), Avenas, Ouroux, Saint-Christophe, Saint-Jacques-des-Arrêts, Saint-Mamert and Trades.

See also
Communes of the Rhône department

References

Communes of Rhône (department)
Beaujolais (province)